Henry Bull Templar Strangways (14 November 1832 – 10 February 1920) was an Australian politician and Premier of South Australia.

Strangways was the eldest son of Henry Bull Strangways of Shapwick, Somerset, England. As a boy, he visited South Australia, where his uncle Thomas Bewes Strangways was a pioneer. Returning to England he entered the Middle Temple in November 1851 and was called to the bar in June 1856. He went to Adelaide early in the following year, was elected to the South Australian House of Assembly for Encounter Bay in January 1858, and became Attorney-General of South Australia in the First Reynolds Ministry from May 1860 to May 1861. The ministry was then reconstructed and Strangways became Commissioner of Crown Lands and Immigration until October 1861. He held the same position in the Waterhouse ministry from October 1861 to July 1863, in the Dutton ministry from March to September 1865, and in the third Ayers ministry from September to October 1865. Strangways represented West Torrens from 17 November 1862 to 28 July 1871.

On 3 November 1868 he became Premier and Attorney-General in a ministry that was reconstructed after an election on 12 May 1870, but was defeated 18 days later. In February 1871 he travelled to England on private business; while there he resigned his seat in the South Australian Parliament and settled instead at Shapwick Manor on the Strangways family's estate in Somerset, where he lived the life of a country gentleman until his death on 10 February 1920.

He retained an interest in South Australia all his life, but does not appear to have revisited it. In January 1861 he married Maria Cordelia Wigley, a sister of William Rodolph Wigley (c. 1826–1890), and was survived by a daughter.

References

External links

 

|-

1832 births
1920 deaths
People from Sedgemoor (district)
Premiers of South Australia
Attorneys-General of South Australia
Members of the South Australian House of Assembly